Coleophora detractella is a moth of the family Coleophoridae. It is found in Canada, including Nova Scotia.

The larvae feed on the seeds of Chenopodium species. They create a trivalved, tubular silken case.

References

detractella
Moths described in 1961
Moths of North America